Robert Pharazyn (1833 – 19 July 1896) was a 19th-century Member of Parliament in the Manawatu region of New Zealand.

Biography

Pharazyn was the son of Charles Johnson Pharazyn. On 15 May 1885, Pharazyn was appointed to the New Zealand Legislative Council; his father had resigned from the Legislative Council, so that he could succeed him. He held that role until his death on 19 July 1896. He was buried at Bolton Street Cemetery.

References

1833 births
1896 deaths
New Zealand MPs for North Island electorates
Members of the New Zealand Legislative Council
Mayors of Wanganui
Members of the New Zealand House of Representatives
Burials at Bolton Street Cemetery
19th-century New Zealand politicians
Pharazyn family